Belagavi division is one of the four divisions of Karnataka state of India. The division comprises the districts of  Bagalkot District, Belgavi district, Vijaypura district , Dharwad District, Gadag District, Haveri District and Uttara Kannada District.

See also
Districts of Karnataka
Sirsi

References

External links
 Official website of the Regional Commissioner of Belagavi division

 
Divisions of Karnataka